Rombout House is a historic home located at Poughkeepsie, Dutchess County, New York.  It was built about 1854 on land that had been part of the original British royal Rombout Patent of 1685 and is a -story, three-bay-wide, Hudson River Bracketed architectural style dwelling.  It sits on a raised basement and features a central pavilion.  It has been owned by Vassar College since 1915.

It was added to the National Register of Historic Places in 1982.

References

Houses on the National Register of Historic Places in New York (state)
Houses completed in 1854
Houses in Poughkeepsie, New York
Vassar College buildings
National Register of Historic Places in Poughkeepsie, New York